(R)-benzylsuccinyl-CoA dehydrogenase (BbsG, (R)-benzylsuccinyl-CoA:(acceptor) oxidoreductase) is an enzyme with systematic name (R)-benzylsuccinyl-CoA:electron transfer flavoprotein oxidoreductase. This enzyme catalyses the following chemical reaction

 (R)-2-benzylsuccinyl-CoA + electron-transfer flavoprotein  (E)-2-benzylidenesuccinyl-CoA + reduced electron-transfer flavoprotein

This enzyme requires FAD as prosthetic group.

References

External links 
 

EC 1.3.8